The Ministry of Finance was created in 1808 with the title Secretaria de Estado dos Negócios do Brasil e da Fazenda. The ministry is responsible for formulating and implementing the country's economic, fiscal and financial policy under the President's supervision. As of January 1, 2023, Fernando Haddad is the Minister of Finance.

See also
List of Ministers of Finance of Brazil

Notes and references

Brasil
Economy
Brazil, Economy